Eudaimonisma is a genus of moths of the family Crambidae. It contains only one species, Eudaimonisma batchelorella, which is found in Australia, where it has been recorded from Queensland, the Northern Territory and South Australia.

References

Spilomelinae
Crambidae genera